Kuf or KUF may refer to:

Language
 Kuf, a letter of the modern Hebrew alphabet
 Katu language, spoken in Southeast Asia (ISO 639: kuf)

Other uses
 Kurumoch International Airport, Samara, Russia (IATA code: KUF)
 Kurdish United Front, a political group of Iranian Kurds
 Jan Kuf, Czech pentathlete